Ptychomitriaceae is a family of mosses in the subclass Dicranidae.

Genera

The family contains six genera.

Aligrimmia 
Campylostelium 
Indusiella 
Jaffueliobryum  
Ptychomitriopsis 
Ptychomitrium

References

Moss families
Grimmiales